is a Japanese manga series written and illustrated by Taiyō Matsumoto about table tennis. It was serialized in Shogakukan's seinen manga magazine Big Comic Spirits from 1996 to 1997 and collected in five tankōbon volumes. The story follows high schoolers and childhood friends Peco and Smile, compete in the national table tennis tournament where they face talented players from all over the country.

It was adapted into a 2002 live-action film. An anime television series adaptation produced by Tatsunoko Production and directed by Masaaki Yuasa was aired on Fuji TV's noitamina block between April and June 2014.

In North America, Funimation streamed and licensed the series in 2014. Viz Media released the manga in 2020.

Premise
Despite having drastically different personalities, high school boys Peco and Smile have been friends since childhood. Now, they are both talented members of table tennis club of Katase High School. Peco gets decisively defeated by a Chinese student and thus becomes so devastated that he quits practicing. Meanwhile, Smile's personality always prevents him from winning against Peco. Coach Jō, however, discovers Smile's potential and tries to motivate him to overcome his psychological obstacle.

Characters

Played by: Arata Iura
A quiet and reserved teen. He is ironically nicknamed Smile because of his stoic nature. Smile is an exceptionally skilled player, but often lacks the drive and ruthlessness to win. Nevertheless, his talent is recognized by many, including Koizumi, Kong, and Kazama.

Played by: Yosuke Kubozuka
Smile's childhood friend. Peco is loud, cocky, and carefree. He is initially considered one of the best players on the Katase team, but begins questioning himself after a couple of surprising losses. Peco is frequently seen snacking on various junk food items.

Played by: Shido Nakamura
Kaio's team captain and star player. Kazama is a dedicated and intimidating athlete who values winning above all else. His skill and power tend to overwhelm even high level opponents. Kazama attempts to recruit Smile to the Kaio team upon noticing his potential.

A childhood rival of Peco's and a member of the Kaio team. Sakuma lacks natural talent but tries to compensate with hard work. He has a combative streak and is fixated on beating Peco as well as proving himself.

Played by: Sam Lee
A transfer student from China who was kicked off the national team. His original goal was to return to his home country after redeeming himself abroad. Kong exudes an air of confidence that belies his feelings of shame and resentment.

Played by: Naoto Takenaka
The elderly coach of the Katase team. Though his behavior is sometimes silly, he has a deep sense of commitment to the sport and can be demanding of his players. Koizumi takes great interest in Smile and decides he will force the young player to achieve his potential through any means necessary.

Played by: Mari Natsuki
The retired chain-smoking owner of the table tennis club where Smile and Peco learned the sport as children. She cares for the two young players, despite her outwardly tough and jaded persona.

Team captain of Katase, known more for his unusual hairstyle than his athletic ability. He helps run the family appliance store and is often occupied with odd jobs after school.

The second-best player on the Kaio team, who secretly envies Kazama and hopes to rival him.

Another top player from Kaio.

Patriarch of the Kazama family, President of Kaio, and Ryuichi's grandfather. He is a shrewd businessman and former professional player who does not tolerate failure.

Yurie's father and Ryuichi's uncle, coach of the Kaio team.

Ryuichi's fashionable cousin, who has feelings for him.

Obaba's son, who trains professional table tennis players.

A player around the same age as Smile and Peco. He is restless by nature and tends to give up easily.

Media

Manga
Ping Pong, written and illustrated by Taiyō Matsumoto, ran in Shogakukan's Big Comic Spirits from 1996 to 1997. The chapters were collected in five wide-ban volumes, released from July 30, 1996, to August 30, 1997. The manga was re-released and reformatted into three volumes between July 14, 2012, and August 10, 2012. Shogakukan re-released a two-volume edition, on April 1, 2014.

In North America, Viz Media announced in May 2020 that they have licensed the manga for English language release. The two volumes, based on the "Full Game" edition, were released on May 19 and September 15, 2020.

Original release

2014 re-release (Full Game edition)

Live-action film

A live-action film adaptation directed by Japanese filmmaker Fumihiko Sori was released in 2002.

Anime
An anime television series adaptation produced by Tatsunoko Production and directed by Masaaki Yuasa premiered on April 11, 2014, on Fuji TV's noitamina block.

In North America, the anime has been licensed by Funimation.

Episode list

Reception

Manga
In 2021, the manga received an Eisner Award nomination in the category Best U.S. Edition of International Material—Asia.

Critical reception
Rose Bridges from Anime News Network praised the two omnibus editions of the manga, in particularly its characters and story giving it an A, and stated "The real story is about Smile and Peco's relationship with each other. This ultimately becomes the catalyst that sets forth their futures, and understanding that relationship is key to understanding the manga's ending—which may come out of nowhere if you're not paying careful attention. It's even more the story of how his friendship with Peco changes Smile, becoming something like his emotional lifeline. Reading Ping Pong 25 years after it wrapped, it's easy to see where it's been so influential. The series changed how sports manga was created, and that's obvious: so many modern-day sports anime clearly have Ping Pong in their DNA. If you haven't seen or read Ping Pong, I won't tell you what happens. The journey they take and the finale should both be richly savored, and these two omnibus editions are the perfect way to do just that. Deservedly one of the classics of sports manga; does a great job juggling the excitement and details of the sport, and building rewarding and layered story and characters; flowing art style that perfectly fits frenetic match scenes; rewards active, deep reading".

Anime
In 2015, Ping Pong the Animation received the Grand Prize award for Television Animation of the Year at the Tokyo Anime Awards Festival. The anime series was part of the Jury Selections at the 18th Japan Media Arts Festival in the Animation category in 2014.

In November 2019, Polygon named Ping Pong the Animation as one of the best anime of the 2010s, and Crunchyroll listed it in their "Top 25 best anime of the 2010s". IGN also listed Ping Pong the Animation among the best anime series of the 2010s. Lauren Orsini of Forbes included the series on her list of the best anime of the decade.

Critical reception
Nick Creamer from Anime News Network praised the anime adaptation and consider it to be a great anime with excellent character design and development, as well as magnificent soundtrack with great animation and story. And describes it as "The show only finds time for all this character development because absolutely zero scenes are wasted. This doesn't mean the show feels rushed - it simply means every line tells you something about a character, and every confrontation between two players changes something in both of them. Ping Pong'''s characters care about winning, but the show itself rises to make points beyond the field of battle. Failure is actually necessary and welcome in Ping Pong, as it is through failure that we grow, and become more than what we were. The show's music and sound design aren't just good, they're indispensable - they are a critical part of the show's aesthetic whole, rollicking opening song and contemplative ending included. Overall, Ping Pong is a triumph of artistry and treasure of storytelling. It's one of the shows I'd recommend to really demonstrate what anime is capable of, and yet it's light and engaging enough to be enjoyed by almost anyone. Highly recommended for all fans of anime as an art form, or just fans of good stories told well. Poignant storytelling, creative art design, propulsive direction, and resonant sound design come together in a brilliant, can't-miss package".

Nicoletta Christina Browne from THEM Anime Reviews gave it a 5 out of 5, and describes the anime as not the most beautiful one compare to other animes directed by Masaaki Yuasa like Kaiba, but the show stands out by its wonderful development and storytelling. Andy Hanley from UK Anime Network also gave a positive review of the anime series and gave it a 9 out of 10, calling it "Its visuals won't appeal to everyone but its story and handling of its characters are almost flawless, resulting in a compelling package that will live long in the memory. Less divisive will be the rest of Ping Pong'''s presentation - its soundtrack is utterly superb and fits the series perfectly, and the voice cast all do a good job of representing their characters in a way which is never overstated and again slots nicely into everything that the show is trying to achieve. Its thanks to Yuasa's take on both the story and how it's presented that this series is more than just another sports anime - it's a pitch-perfect examination of growing up, sporting endeavour and plenty more besides. No matter your take on its animation style, you'll be hard-pressed to find a better character study in animated series".

Awards

References

External links
 Official anime website 
  at Viz Media
 Ping Pong home page on Funimation
 

Anime series based on manga
Aniplex
Coming-of-age anime and manga
Funimation
Noitamina
Psychological anime and manga
Seinen manga
Shogakukan franchises
Shogakukan manga
Table tennis in anime and manga
Taiyō Matsumoto
Tatsunoko Production
Viz Media manga